Chandrakant Trimbak Patankar  (born 24 November 1930) is a former Indian cricketer who played in one Test in 1955.

Life and career
Born in Pen in the Raigad district of Maharashtra, Patankar attended Bombay University, gaining an MSc. He played first-class cricket for Bombay from 1950 to 1966, then had a season for Maharashtra in 1966-67.

A wicketkeeper and lower-order right-handed batsman, Patankar replaced his Bombay wicketkeeping colleague Naren Tamhane, who was injured, for the fourth game of the five-match Test series against New Zealand in 1955-56, but lost his place when Tamhane replaced him for the final game of the series. He played in Bombay's Ranji Trophy-winning teams in 1960-61 and 1965-66, but never played an uninterrupted season, Tamhane being the senior Bombay wicket-keeper for most of that period. In the Ranji Trophy semi-final against Madras in 1953-54 he made five stumpings in Bombay's 379-run victory, then lost his place to Tamhane for the final. He usually batted in the tail without making many runs, but when he opened the batting for the Maharana of Mewar's XI against the Associated Cement Company in the 1964-65 Moin-ud-Dowlah Gold Cup Tournament he not only scored his only first-class fifty but went on to score 100.

Patankar worked for the Indian companies BEST, Killick Indus and Laxmi Vishnu.

References

External links
 

1930 births
Living people
University of Mumbai alumni
India Test cricketers
Indian cricketers
Indian Universities cricketers
Maharashtra cricketers
Mumbai cricketers
People from Raigad district
Cricketers from Maharashtra
Wicket-keepers